Wladimir Kaminer (born 19 July 1967) is a Russian-born German short story writer, columnist and disc jockey of Jewish origin, the son of Viktor and Shanna Kaminer.

Kaminer was born in Moscow, and after initially training as an audio engineer for theatre and radio, then studied dramaturgy at the Moscow Institute of Theatre. Following the collapse of the Berlin Wall, Kaminer emigrated to Marzahn, Berlin, in 1990.

From the late 1990s onward Kaminer became a prime mover in Berlin's art and literature scenes, based at the reopened Kaffee Burger club. He holds regular readings at the cafe, and also contributes regularly to various German literary organs. Kaminer also hosts a weekly radio show, called Wladimir's World, on Rundfunk Berlin-Brandenburg's (formerly Sender Freies Berlin) RADIOmultikulti, a station aimed at immigrants in Germany. Kaminer also regularly DJs at his "Russendiskos", during which he exclusively plays music by Russian bands. These discos originally began at the Kaffee Burger, but now also occasionally tour Germany.

Though Russian is his first language, Kaminer's entire literary output is in German, and sometimes concerns the language contact situation of Russian immigrants to Germany.

In 2006 he announced his intention to run for Mayor of Berlin in 2011. The final chapter of his 2007 book Ich bin kein Berliner was subtitled "My first speech as mayoral candidate" (Meine erste Rede als Bürgermeisterkandidat).

Bibliography
 Russendisko. Goldmann, München 2000, . Taschenbuchausgabe: Goldmann, München 2002, 
 Schönhauser Allee. Goldmann, München 2001, . Taschenbuch: 
 Frische Goldjungs. Goldmann, München 2001, . Taschenbuch: 
 Militärmusik. Goldmann, München 2001, . Taschenbuchausgabe: Goldmann, München 2003, 
 Die Reise nach Trulala. Goldmann, München 2002, . Taschenbuchausgabe: Goldmann, München 2004, 
 Helden des Alltags. (Ein lichtbildgestützter Vortrag über die seltsamen Sitten der Nachkriegszeit. Mit Helmut Höge.) Goldmann, München 2002, 
 Mein deutsches Dschungelbuch. Goldmann, München 2003, . Taschenbuchausgabe: Goldmann, München 2004, 
 Ich mache mir Sorgen, Mama. Goldmann, München 2004, . Taschenbuchausgabe: Goldmann, München 2006, 
 Karaoke. Goldmann, München 2005, . Taschenbuchausgabe: Goldmann, München 2007, 
 Küche totalitär. Das Kochbuch des Sozialismus. Goldmann, München 2007,  (Mit Olga Kaminer, Illustrationen Vitali Konstantinov).
 Ich bin kein Berliner. Ein Reiseführer für faule Touristen. Goldmann, München 2007,  (Illustrationen Vitali Konstantinov)
 Mein Leben im Schrebergarten. Goldmann, München 2007, . Taschenbuchausgabe: Goldmann, München 2009,  (Illustrationen Vitali Konstantinov)
 Salve Papa! Goldmann, München 2008,  Taschenbuchausgabe: Goldmann, München 2010,  (Illustrationen Vitali Konstantinov)
 Es gab keinen Sex im Sozialismus. Legenden und Missverständnisse des vorigen Jahrhunderts. Goldmann, München 2009,  (Illustrationen Vitali Konstantinov)
 Meine russischen Nachbarn. Goldmann, München 2009,  (Illustrationen Vitali Konstantinov)
 mit Kitty Kahane: Das Leben ist kein Joghurt. Wladimir Kaminer & Kitty Kahane erzählen eine Geschichte von Adam & Eva. Edition Chrismon im Hansischen Druck- und Verlagshaus, Frankfurt am Main 2010, 
 Meine kaukasische Schwiegermutter. Goldmann, München 2010,  (Illustrationen Vitali Konstantinov)
 Liebesgrüße aus Deutschland. Goldmann, München 2011, 
 Onkel Wanja kommt. Eine Reise durch die Nacht. Goldmann, München 2012, 
 Diesseits von Eden. Neues aus dem Garten. Goldmann, München 2013, .
 Coole Eltern leben länger. Manhattan, München 2014, 
 Das Leben ist (k)eine Kunst. Manhattan, München 2015, 
 Meine Mutter, ihre Katze und der Staubsauger. Ein Unruhestand in 33 Geschichten. Manhattan. München 2016, 
 Goodbye, Moskau. Betrachtungen über Russland. Goldmann, München 2017, 
 Einige Dinge, die ich über meine Frau weiß. Wunderraum, München 2017,

References

1967 births
Living people
Writers from Moscow
German columnists
German satirists
German DJs
German male short story writers
German short story writers
German male non-fiction writers
Writers from Berlin
Electronic dance music DJs
Russian emigrants to Germany